Fulgenius was a legendary king of the Britons, mentioned in Geoffrey of Monmouth's pseudohistorical Historia Regum Britanniae. He was the first of the three sons of Cherin to succeed his father, and was followed by his brothers, first Edadus then Andragius.

References

Legendary British kings
2nd-century BC legendary rulers